Alpine skiing  at the 2017 European Youth Olympic Winter Festival was held at the Palandoken Ski Centre in Erzurum, Turkey from 13 to 17 February 2017.

Medal table

Medal summary

Boys events

Ladies events

Mixed events

References

External links
Results Book – Alpine Skiing

2017 in alpine skiing
2017 European Youth Olympic Winter Festival events
2017